Song of Youth is a 2012 music video album by Yuvan Shankar Raja and directed by Dhanapal Padmanabhan. The popular song of the same title, based on which the album is made, was written by former President of India Dr. A. P. J. Abdul Kalam and is set to tunes by Yuvan, who, along with Kalam and many other celebrities from the field of sports and entertainment, will feature in the video as well. The video album is directed by Dhanapal Padmanabhan, who earlier made a documentary "A Little Dream" on Kalam. Aravind Krishna, a young cinematographer from the Tamil film industry, will shoot the video. It is a trilingual album, produced in Hindi, English and Tamil - however, remains unreleased.

Background
More than 20 years ago, when Doordarshan had the legends from all walks of life singing Mile Sur Mera Tumhara integrating India, the song became almost an anthem for the youths. Several years later, another such song is in the making, and instead of legends, those who will be featured in the music video are youth icons of India who can lead and inspire more than 50 per cent of India's population. The man behind this venture is Dhanapal Padmanabhan of Minveli Media Works, who had earlier made A Little Dream, a documentary on former President Dr. Abdul Kalam.

After some time Dhanapal decided to make a music video on the song, that Kalam wrote for the youth, so that it will reach many more youngsters in India. Dhanpal's intention while making this song was to celebrate the power of Indian Youth and inspire them. Dhanpal said, "Dr. Kalam is always ready to do anything that reaches and inspires the youth of India. With a song by Kalam, I can reach as many youngsters as possible, and my intention was to make it as grand as possible. So, I have decided to show the diversity in our landscape and the huge talent that is available". Dhanpal added that the obvious choice for the slot of music director was Yuvan Shankar Raja, because of his young age, and also he is the "Youth Icon". Dhanpal added more, "When I told Yuvan about the project, he said that he was honoured to compose music for such a video." Yuvan was very excited about the whole idea and he will be on the lead for the video with Kalam. Dhanapal concludes, "This will be a National Anthem for the Youths in India".

Video Shoot
Dhanapal has planned to shoot at all the heritage places in India like the India Gate, Jaipur Fort, etc. He says, "I will show various Indian dance forms dancing to Kalam's song. Yuvan's music is aimed at the youth, so it will be fast paced and aggressive in nature. I want to have at least one shot and dance form from each state."

References

2011 albums